Salama III (died 25 October 1867) was Abuna or head of the Ethiopian Orthodox Tewahedo Church (1841–1867).

Salama was originally brought to the Ethiopian Empire by Dejazmach Wube Haile Maryam. He afterwards attached himself to the party of Emperor Tewodros II for his help to settle the theological disputes dividing the Ethiopian Church and to gain control over the fractured Church organization.

As Tewodros' power dwindled, however, Salama found himself more often at odds with the emperor until he was made a prisoner (1864), and eventually confined to the village of Amba Mariam (then called Magdala in Wollo Province), where he died of bronchitis aggravated by his detention.

Notes

Further reading 
 Donald Crummey and Getatchew Haile, "Abunä Sälama: Metropolitan of Ethiopia, 1841-1867 A New Gə'əz Biography", Journal of Ethiopian Studies, 37 (2004), pp. 5-40

Year of birth unknown
19th-century births
1867 deaths
Archbishops of Ethiopia
Deaths from bronchitis
19th century in Ethiopia
19th-century Oriental Orthodox bishops